"Let Me Down Slowly" is a song by American singer-songwriter Alec Benjamin, originally released as a solo version in 2018 and included on his mixtape Narrated for You before being re-released as a duet with Canadian singer Alessia Cara in early 2019. Billboard called the track Benjamin's "vulnerable breakout hit".

Background 
Benjamin wrote the song in 2017 about an experience with an ex-girlfriend. It was one of the songs that Atlantic Records heard before signing him. The song was produced by Sir Nolan, with additional production by Aaron Z, and co-written by Benjamin with Michael Pollack and Sir Nolan.

Music videos 
The music video for the solo version was released on June 4, 2018, and for the duet version on February 6, 2019. Benjamin and Cara then made a video for an acoustic version of the song, which was released two weeks later.

The first video revolves around a woman's relationship with her lover failing, culminating in the woman raiding a convenience store; Benjamin appears as a bystander throughout the video. The second video features Benjamin and Cara singing their verses alone in different locations, intercut with scenes of couples embracing.

Track listing 
 Digital download
 "Let Me Down Slowly" – 2:49

 Digital download
 "Let Me Down Slowly" (featuring Alessia Cara) – 2:49

Charts

Weekly charts

Year-end charts

Certifications

See also 
List of Airplay 100 number ones of the 2020s

References 

2018 singles
2018 songs
2019 singles
Alessia Cara songs
Songs written by Sir Nolan
Songs written by Michael Pollack (musician)
Number-one singles in Romania
Atlantic Records singles
Songs written by Alec Benjamin